Basten is both a surname and a given name. Notable people with the name include:

Alice Basten (1876–1955), New Zealand businesswoman and politician
John Basten (born 1947), Australian judge
Basten Caerts (born 1997), Belgian swimmer
Marco van Basten (born 1964), Dutch footballer and manager

Surnames from given names